is a rural district in Miyagi Prefecture, in the Tōhoku region of northern Japan.

History
Kami District is first recorded in the Nara Period as "賀美郡".  During the Edo period the kanji of its name was changed to "加美郡". Under the Tokugawa shogunate, the district was within Mutsu Province and was under the control of the Date clan of Sendai Domain. In 1869, following the Meiji restoration, Mutsu Province was divided, with the area of Kami District becoming part of Rikuzen Province, and from 1872, part of Miyagi Prefecture. In the establishment of the modern municipalities system, the district was organized into one town (Nakaniida (中新田町)) and six villages (Hirohara (広原村), Naruse (鳴瀬村), Onoda (小野田村), Miyazaki (宮崎村), Kamiishi (賀美石村), and Shikama (色麻村)).

1 April 1894 District offices established in Nakaniida Town
1 July 1926 District offices abolished
11 February 1943 Onoda elevated to town status
1 July 1954 Kamiishi and Miyazaki Village merge to form Miyazaki Town
1 August 1954 Hirohara and, Naruse villages merge with Nakaniida
1 April 1978 Shikama elevated to town status
1 April 2003 Nakaniida, Onoda and Miyazaki merge to form Kami

Districts in Miyagi Prefecture